Southampton, officially the Town of Southampton, is a town in southeastern Suffolk County, New York, partly on the South Fork of Long Island. As of the 2020 U.S. census, the town had a population of 69,036. Southampton is included in the stretch of shoreline prominently known as The Hamptons.

Stony Brook University's Southampton campus is located in Southampton.

History

The town was founded in 1640, when settlers from Lynn, Massachusetts established residence on lands obtained from local Shinnecock Indian Nation. The first settlers included eight men, one woman, and a boy who came ashore at Conscience Point. These men were Thomas Halsey, Edward Howell, Edmond Farrington, Allen Bread, Edmund Needham, Abraham Pierson the Elder, Thomas Sayre, Josiah Stanborough, George Welbe, Henry Walton and Job Sayre. By July 7, 1640, they had determined the town boundaries. During the next few years (1640–43), Southampton gained another 43 families and now there are thousands of people in southampton.

From 1644, the colonists established an organised whale fishery, significant in the history of whaling as the first in New England. They chased pilot whales ("blackfish") onto the shelving beaches for slaughter, a sort of dolphin drive hunting. They also processed drift whales they found on shore. They observed the Native Americans' hunting techniques, improved on their weapons and boats, and then went out to ocean hunting.

The first meeting house was on a hill that is the site of the current Southampton Hospital. The town's oldest existent house is the Halsey House at 249 Main Street, which was built by Thomas Halsey, one of the first Englishmen to trade with the Shinnecocks.

Southampton has 47 public and private cemeteries, not including Shinnecock Hills Golf Club, which is claimed as an Indian burial ground that is no longer in active use. Southampton is named after the port city of Southampton in Hampshire, England.

Southampton operates an official historical web site. The site shows the locations of over 100 points of interest, historic markers, and historic districts as well as over 1500 photos.

Native American land claim
In 2005, the Shinnecock Indian Nation filed a lawsuit against the state seeking the return of 3,500 acres (14 km2) in Southampton near the tribe's reservation, and billions of dollars in reparations for damages suffered by colonial land grabs. The disputed property includes the Shinnecock Hills Golf Club, which Shinnecock say is the location of tribe burial grounds. The tribe challenged the state legislatures' approval of an 1859 sale of the 3,500 acres of tribal land. The tribe alleged this broke the terms of a 1,000-year-lease signed by Southampton colonial officials and the tribe in 1703. The suit charged that in 1859, a group of powerful New York investors conspired to break the lease by sending the state Legislature a fraudulent petition from a number of Shinnecock tribal members. Although other tribal members immediately protested that the petition was a forgery, the legislature approved the sale of 3,500 acres (14 km2) of tribal land. In 2006, the court ruled against the tribe finding the lawsuit was barred by laches.

Geography
According to the U.S. Census Bureau, the town has an area of 295.6 square miles (765.6 km2), of which 138.9 square miles (359.7 km2)  is land and 156.7 square miles (405.9 km2  is water. The total area is 53.02% water.

Southampton contains seven incorporated villages and 16 unincorporated areas, which are called hamlets in New York state.

Villages (incorporated) 
Source:
 North Haven
 Quogue
 Sag Harbor – partially, with the Town of East Hampton
 Sagaponack
 Southampton (village)
 Westhampton Beach
 West Hampton Dunes

Hamlets (unincorporated) 
Source:
 
 Bridgehampton
 Eastport – partially, with the Town of Brookhaven
 East Quogue
 Flanders
 Hampton Bays
 Northampton
 North Sea
 Noyack – also spelled Noyac
 Quiogue
 Remsenburg – also see Remsenburg-Speonk
 Riverside
 Shinnecock Hills
 Speonk – also see Remsenburg-Speonk
 Tuckahoe
 Water Mill
 Westhampton

Demographics

As of the census of 2000, there were 54,712 people, 21,504 households and 13,805 families residing in the town. The population density was 394.0 people per square mile (152.1/km2). There were 35,836 housing units at an average density of 258.0 per square mile (99.6/km2). The town's racial makeup was 87.98% White, 6.62% Black or African American, 0.41% Native American, 0.89% Asian, 0.08% Pacific Islander, 2.28% from other races, and 1.73% from two or more races.

There were 21,504 households, of which 27.1% had children under the age of 18 living with them, 50.8% were married couples living together, 9.3% had a female householder with no husband present, and 35.8% were non-families. 28.6% of all households were made up of individuals, and 12.2% had someone living alone who was 65 years of age or older. The average household size was 2.45 and the average family size was 2.99.

In the town, the population was spread out, with 21.1% under the age of 18, 7.7% from 18 to 24, 28.5% from 25 to 44, 26.0% from 45 to 64, and 16.6% who were 65 years of age or older. The median age was 40 years. For every 100 females, there were 99.2 males. For every 100 females age 18 and over, there were 97.2 males. The town's median household income was $53,887, and the median family income was $65,144. Males had a median income of $47,167 versus $32,054 for females. The town's per capita income was $31,320. About 5.3% of families and 8.3% of the population were below the poverty line, including 10.2% of those under age 18 and 6.0% of those age 65 or over.

In 2016, according to Business Insider, the 11962 zip code encompassing Sagaponack, within Southampton, was listed as the most expensive in the U.S., with a median home sale price of $8.5 million.

Economy
Major employers in Southampton include

Government
The town supervisor is Jay Schneiderman, a former Independence Party member, now a registered member of the Democratic Party, who was elected in November 2015 with 56.34% of the vote, and again in November 2017 with 62.3%.

Media

Print 
 The Southampton Press

Radio stations 
 Bridgehampton - WBAZ (102.5 FM)
 Hampton Bays - WLIR (107.1 FM)
 Sag Harbor - WLNG (92.1 FM)
 Southampton - WHFM (95.3 FM), WLIW (88.3 FM), WRLI (91.3 FM)
 Westhampton - WBON (98.5 FM)

Infrastructure

Transportation

Railroad lines
The Long Island Rail Road's sole line in the Town of Southampton is the Montauk Branch, which includes stations in Speonk, Westhampton, Hampton Bays, Southampton and Bridgehampton. Quogue and Southampton Campus also had their own stations until 1998.

Bus service
The Town of Southampton is served primarily by Suffolk County Transit bus routes, although Hampton Jitney buses are available for trips to and from New York City.

Major roads

  New York State Route 24
  New York State Route 27
  New York State Route 114
 County Route 38 (Suffolk County, New York)
 County Route 51 (Suffolk County, New York)
 County Route 79 (Suffolk County, New York)
 Montauk Highway, including County Route 80 (Suffolk County, New York)
 County Route 104 (Suffolk County, New York)
 County Route 105 (Suffolk County, New York)

Airports
The town of Southampton contains the Francis S. Gabreski Airport north of Westhampton, and East Hampton Airport along the Southampton-East Hampton Town Line. The Southampton Heliport can also be found on the east side of the Shinnecock Inlet.

Ferries
The sole ferry in the Town of Southampton takes NY 114 drivers across the Shelter Island Sound between North Haven and Shelter Island.

Notable people
 Riley Biggs, American football player
 Tim Bishop, U.S. Representative
 Amanda Clark, Olympic sailor
 Mary L. Cleave, engineer and NASA astronaut
 Pyrrhus Concer, former slave
 Pamela Council, artist
 Scott Disick, reality television celebrity
 Michael J. Fox, actor
 Paul Gibson, Major League baseball pitcher
 Grenville Goodwin, anthropologist
 Nicoll Halsey, U.S. Representative
 George Rogers Howell, historian
 Andre Johnson, NFL football player
 John William Kilbreth, U.S. Army brigadier general
 Calvin Klein, fashion designer
 David Koch, billionaire
 Orson Desaix Munn II, publisher
 Jacqueline Bouvier Kennedy Onassis, First Lady of the United States (1961-63)
 Jean Shafiroff, philanthropist and socialite
 Howard Stein, financier
 Howard Stern, radio host
 Carlos Eduardo Stolk, business magnate
 Foots Walker, NBA basketball player
 P. G. Wodehouse, writer
 Zach Erdem, restauranter and reality television celebrity
 Carl Yastrzemski, Hall of Fame Major League baseball player

See also
Basilica of the Sacred Hearts of Jesus and Mary (Southampton, New York)
National Register of Historic Places listings in Southampton (town), New York

References

External links

 Town of Southampton (official site)
History of Southampton
 Pictures and Info on Southampton's Historic Estates

 
Towns on Long Island
Towns in Suffolk County, New York
Towns in the New York metropolitan area
Populated coastal places in New York (state)
1640 establishments in the British Empire